Bryce James Lampman (born August 31, 1982) is an American former professional ice hockey Defenseman who played in the National Hockey League with the New York Rangers.

Playing career
Lampman was drafted 113th overall by the New York Rangers in the 2001 NHL Entry Draft. He has spent most of his professional career with the Rangers' AHL affiliate the Hartford Wolf Pack, though he has played ten games in the NHL for the Rangers.  He played the 2008–09 season in Russia with HC Amur Khabarovsk, before signing as a free agent with the St. Louis Blues as a depth defenseman on July 29, 2009. Lampman is mostly known for scoring from center ice on a slapshot that beat Chicago Wolves' goalie Kari Lehtonen which led to an eventual 5–4 win on January 23, 2010, in the first period of an AHL game between the Peoria Rivermen and the Chicago Wolves.

In the 2010–11 season, Lampman, a free agent, began the season belatedly on a professional try-out with the Houston Aeros of the AHL on November 16, 2010. After five games he left the Aeros and signed with a German team, ERC Ingolstadt, of the DEL for the remainder of the year on December 24, 2010.

Lampman signed with the Florida Everblades of the ECHL on December 27, 2013. After 8 games with the Everblades in the 2013–14 season, Lampman returned to Europe, completing his 12 year career with Norwegian club, Lørenskog IK of the GET-ligaen.

Career statistics

Regular season and playoffs

International

References

External links

1982 births
Living people
American men's ice hockey defensemen
Amur Khabarovsk players
ERC Ingolstadt players
American expatriate ice hockey players in Russia
Florida Everblades players
Hannover Scorpions players
Hartford Wolf Pack players
Houston Aeros (1994–2013) players
Ice hockey players from Minnesota
Iowa Stars players
Kamloops Blazers players
Lørenskog IK players
New York Rangers players
New York Rangers draft picks
Norfolk Admirals players
Omaha Lancers players
Omaha Mavericks men's ice hockey players
Orlando Solar Bears (ECHL) players
Peoria Rivermen (AHL) players
Portland Pirates players
Rochester Mustangs players
Sportspeople from Rochester, Minnesota
SCL Tigers players